The National Housing Federation (NHF) is a trade association for member housing associations in England.

Function
The National Housing Federation (NHF) is a trade or industry body representing providers of social housing in England. The Federation head office is situated near Holborn tube station in London with a second office in Bristol.

It represents the work of member housing associations and campaigns on a range of housing and social policy issues. The Federation's members provide approximately two and a half million homes for more than five million people. Each year they invest in a diverse range of neighbourhood projects that help create strong, vibrant communities.

In 2010, the NHF was one of a number of organisations to successfully campaign to prevent energy companies charging pre-pay meter customers more than quarterly billed customers.

Members of the Federation possess approximately two million five hundred thousand residences.

Areas of activity

The Federation campaigns at a local and national level to ensure housing associations can continue to deliver affordable housing, contributes to the housing and social policy agenda on issues such as sustainability, care and support, equality and homelessness, organises events including conferences and exhibitions for the social housing sector, provides training specifically aimed at housing professionals and member organisation board members, publishes guides, books, manuals, online resources and free downloadable documents for housing professionals and delivers services encompassing a range of organisational and business support for member organisations and their tenants.

History
The NHF was formerly known as the National Federation of Housing Associations, which was situated at 88 Old Street, London. It has also previously occupied premises in Gray's Inn Road.

See also
 Housing association
 The Almshouse Association

References

External links 
Publications of the National Housing Federation

 
Year of establishment missing
Housing organisations based in London